Women's football in Japan is one of the rising powers of women's football.

History
The first women's football team in Japan was formed in 1966.

In the first national female football tournament in 1980, women played 8-a-side football and on smaller soccer fields than their male counterparts.

National competition
The WE League was established in the 2021–22 season as Japan's first fully professional women's football league. It replaced the top level Nadeshiko League as the country's top women's league. The Nadeshiko League now occupies the two levels below the WE League.

The Nadeshiko League began in 1989. It was a three-tiered system, but has since reverted to a two-tier system.

National team

The team, organized by the Japan Football Association, is the only Asian women's side to win FIFA Women's World Cup, winning in 2011. The Japanese national team playing style has been compared to Spain's men's national team of Tiki-taka.

In Fiction
 While there are not many depictions of Japanese women's football in fiction, one prominent example is the manga Mai Ball! by Inoue Sora. It depicts a Japanese high school girls' team as they rise to the challenge of being the national best in the Japanese high school girls' football tournament.

See also

 Sports in Japan
 Football in Japan
 Women's football in Japan
 Japan Football Association (JFA)

 Japanese association football league system
 WE League (I)
 Nadeshiko League
 Nadeshiko League Division 1 (II)
 Nadeshiko League Division 2 (III)
 Regional Leagues (IV)
 Empress's Cup (National Cup)
 Nadeshiko League Cup (League Cup)

References

 
Football in Japan